Dexter Vines is an American comic book artist and inker, known for his collaborations with pencilers such as Steve McNiven and Ed McGuinness, the latter of whom he is credited with as "eDex" team.

Career
Vines has worked on a multitude of titles for both Marvel and DC. Some titles include Marvel's big 2007 summer event Civil War, Tangent Comics Power Girl, Superman/Batman, JLA Classified (all with McGuinness), and Wolverine.

Awards
 2007 Will Eisner Comic Industry Awards - Nominee - Best Penciller/Inker or Penciller/Inker Team: (Civil War (Marvel) - with Steve McNiven)
 2012, Vines received the 2012 Inkwell Award for Favorite Small Press And Mainstream-Independent (S.P.A.M.I.) ink work over another pencil artist.

References

External links

An Audio Interview with Dexter Vines by SiDEBAR

Living people
African-American comics creators
American comics creators
Artists from Atlanta
1971 births
21st-century African-American people
20th-century African-American people